Handle with Care is the third studio album by American thrash metal band Nuclear Assault released in 1989. This is the band's most successful and best-selling album to date, peaking at number 126 on the Billboard 200, making it their highest position so far. "Critical Mass" was released as a single to promote the album.

Reception

Reviews for Handle with Care have been mostly positive. AllMusic's Eduardo Rivadavia awards the album four-and-a-half stars out of five and describes it as "a record which stands the test of time as one of the East Coast's best offerings to the thrash metal genre." Rivadavia also praises Handle with Care a "perfect introduction, and pretty much all one will ever need from Nuclear Assault", while he describes "Critical Mass," "F♮ (Wake Up)," and "When Freedom Dies" as "outstanding thrashers."

Handle with Care entered the Billboard 200 album charts in February 1990, three months after its release. The album peaked at number 126 and remained on the chart for 24 weeks.

Handle with Care was ranked at number seven on Loudwire'''s top ten list of "Thrash Albums NOT Released by the Big 4".

Anecdotes
The sentence "The svastika is calling you", which is heard at the very end of the song "Torture Tactics", is taken from the movie The Blues Brothers. This sentence is yelled on the megaphone by the head of the Illinois Nazi Party (played by Henry Gibson) during the scene of the bridge. "Torture Tactics" being a very caricatured political song towards Nazis, this sentence is suited, since The Blues Brothers is a caricatured movie too.

Track listing

Tracks 13-18 taken from the Live at the Hammersmith Odeon'' album

Personnel
Nuclear Assault
John Connelly – guitar, vocals
Anthony Bramante – lead guitar
Dan Lilker – bass
Glenn Evans – drums

Additional musicians 
Barry Stern, Mo Alonso, Ron Holzner – backing vocals

Production
Randy Burns – producer
Casey McMakin – engineer
Larry Malchose, Steve Heinke – assistant engineers

References

1989 albums
Nuclear Assault albums